Basketball at the 1988 Summer Olympics was the twelfth appearance of the sport of basketball as an official Olympic medal event. It took place at the Jamsil Gymnasium in Seoul, South Korea from 17 September to 30 September 1988. The United States won the gold medal in the women's competition, repeating their performance from the 1984 tournament. In the men's tournament, the Soviet Union took home their second gold medal in the team's history for this event. In the team, Baltic basketballers were overrepresented: Sabonis, Chomičius, Kurtinaitis and Marčiulionis were Lithuanian, Miglinieks was Latvian, and Tiit Sokk was Estonian.

This was the last Olympic basketball tournament where NBA players were not allowed to participate; FIBA voted in a rule change in 1989 that lifted that restriction, leading to the dominance of 1992's Dream Team.

Medalists

Qualification
A NOC could enter one men's team with 12 players and one women's team with 12 players. For both tournaments, automatic qualifications were granted to the host country and the winners from the previous edition. For the men's tournament, the remaining teams were decided by the continental championships in Asia, Oceania, Africa and Americas and European qualifying tournament. Champions of Asia and Oceania, top two teams from Africa and top three from Americas earned direct qualification. The last three berths were allocated from the European qualifying tournament, held in the Netherlands, two months before Olympics tournament. For the women's tournament, qualification was decided by a tournament held in Kuala Lumpur, Malaysia, where the top six teams earned a spot.

Men

Women

Format
Men's tournament:
 Two groups of six teams are formed, where the top four from each group advance to the knockout stage.
 Fifth and sixth places from each group form an additional bracket to decide 9th–12th places in the final ranking.
 In the quarterfinals, the match ups are as follows: A1 vs. B4, A2 vs. B3, A3 vs. B2 and A4 vs. B1.
 The four teams eliminated from the quarterfinals form an additional bracket to decide 5th–8th places in the final ranking.
 The winning teams from the quarterfinals meet in the semifinals as follows: A1/B4 vs. A3/B2 and A2/B3 vs. A4/B1.
 The winning teams from the semifinals contest the gold medal. The losing teams contest the bronze.

Women's tournament:
 Two groups of four teams are formed, where the top two teams from each group advance to the knockout stage.
 Third and fourth places from each group form an additional bracket to decide 5th–8th places in the final ranking.
 In the semifinals, the match ups are as follows: A1 vs. B2, A2 vs. B1.
 The winning teams from the semifinals contest the gold medal. The losing teams contest the bronze.

Tie-breaking criteria:
 Head to head results
 Goal average (not the goal difference) between the tied teams
 Goal average of the tied teams for all teams in its group

Men's tournament

Preliminary round
The top four places in each of the preliminary round groups advanced to the eight team, single-elimination knockout stage, where Group A teams would meet Group B teams. Hosts Korea couldn't advance, finishing at the bottom of their group. The other Asia representative, China, met the same fate, together with the two African teams, Egypt and Central African Republic.

Group A

Group B

Knockout stage

Championship bracket

Women's tournament

Preliminary round
The first two places in each of the preliminary round groups advanced to the semifinals, where Group A teams would meet Group B teams. Like their male counterparts, the Korea women's team didn't manage to advance to the knockout stage and ended up battling for 5th place against the other Asian representative, China and two of the European teams, Bulgaria and Czechoslovakia.

Group A

Group B

Knockout stage

Championship bracket

Final standings

References

 Official Olympic Report
 USA Basketball
 1988 Olympic Games: Tournament for Men, FIBA Archive
 1988 Olympic Games: Tournament for Women, FIBA Archive

 
1988
basketball
1988 in basketball
International basketball competitions hosted by South Korea